Kasu Mela Kasu is a 2018 Indian Tamil-language comedy drama film directed by K. S. Pazhani and starring Shahrukh and Gayatri Rema.

Cast 

Shahrukh as Murali
Gayatri Rema as Myna
Mayilsamy as Periyasamy, Murali's father
Kovai Sarala as beggar and Myna's mother
Nalini as Murali' s paternal aunt
Swaminathan as Murali' s maternal uncle
R.srimati
 Lollu Sabha Easter as kidnapper 
K. S. Pazhani as Myna's father
 Jangiri Madhumitha as Myna's step mother
 Sangeetha Balan
Vasathakumar as Priest
Ganja Karuppu (cameo appearance)
 Lollu Sabha Mullai (special appearance)
KPY Kothandam (special appearance)

Release 
The Times of India gave the film a rating of one out of five stars and wrote that "Going by the primitive filmmaking and storytelling in this film, it feels quite a meta statement!". The New Indian Express wrote that "Throughout its painfully long runtime of 130 minutes, this KS Palani-directorial fails to evoke as much as a grin".

References

External links 

2018 comedy-drama films
Indian comedy-drama films